The Forgotten Landscapes Project was a three-year partnership project funded by the Heritage Lottery Fund and the Welsh Government intended to further develop the Blaenavon area in southeast Wales for visitors.

Amongst its stated aims are the protection of the area’s considerable industrial heritage, conservation of common land and heather moorland and access improvements. The project is also  providing additional educational material, information and interpretation on the area including a programme of walks and talks.

References 

Tourism in Wales
Tourism organisations in the United Kingdom